The 2016–17 GFF Elite League (known as the 2016–17 Stag Elite League for sponsorship reasons) is the 16th season of the highest competitive football league in Guyana, and the 2nd season of the Elite League. Eight FIFA licensed clubs participated in the inaugural Elite League season. 

Slingerz are the defending champions, but are not participating in the league this season, due to being in bad standing with the Guyana Football Federation.

Teams

Alpha United and Slingerz withdrew from the competition and were thus deemed to be in bad standing with the Guyana Football Federation.

Source:

Standings

Top scorers

References 

GFF Elite League seasons
Guyana
football
football